"I Love Rock 'n' Roll" is a rock song written by Alan Merrill and Jake Hooker and first recorded by the Arrows, a British rock band, in 1975. A 1981 cover version by Joan Jett & the Blackhearts, released as the first single from her album of the same name, became Jett's highest-charting hit, reaching number one on the Billboard Hot 100 and becoming the No. 3 song for 1982. The single was certified platinum by the Recording Industry Association of America, representing two million units shipped to stores. Jett's version was inducted into the Grammy Hall of Fame in 2016.

Arrows original version
The song was originally recorded and released by Arrows in 1975 on Rak Records, with Merrill on lead vocals and guitar and Mickie Most producing. Merrill wrote both the music and lyrics, whilst living in London at Nell Gwynn House in Chelsea.  He gave a co-writer credit to Hooker as part of settling a debt. In an interview with Songfacts, Merrill said he wrote the song as "a knee-jerk response to the Rolling Stones' 'It's Only Rock 'n Roll (But I Like It)'."
This version was first released as a B-side, but was soon re-recorded and flipped to A-side status on a subsequent pressing of the record. Arrows performed the song in 1975 on the Muriel Young-produced show 45, after which Young offered Arrows a weekly UK television series, Arrows, which was broadcast on ITV starting in March 1976.

Joan Jett version

Joan Jett saw the Arrows perform "I Love Rock 'n' Roll" on their weekly UK television series Arrows while she was touring England with the Runaways in 1976. She first recorded the song in 1979 with two of the Sex Pistols, Steve Jones and Paul Cook. This first version was released on vinyl in 1979 on Vertigo records as a B-side to "You Don't Own Me". In 1981, Jett re-recorded the song, this time with her band, the Blackhearts. This recording became a US Billboard Hot 100 number-one single for seven weeks, being the only one for the band.

Record World said it "has anthem qualities and heroic lead
guitar riffs."

Music video
The music video for "I Love Rock 'n Roll" produced by Barry Ralbag, received heavy play by the fledgling MTV network. It featured Jett and the Blackhearts traveling to a small, dingy bar and then exciting the drunken crowd by performing the song and yelling out its chorus. A snippet of Jett's 1981 hit "Bad Reputation" can be heard at the beginning of the video. The video was originally in color, but it was converted to black and white because Jett hated the look of her red leather jumpsuit in color.

In 1993 Joan Jett & the Blackhearts made another music video for the song as part of the Wayne's World 2 soundtrack. The video consisted of scenes from the movie, with Mike Myers and Dana Carvey, mixed with footage of Jett and her band in a faux concert filmed at Irving Plaza in NYC. At one point during the filming, one person was introduced to the crowd as having been in the original video as he set up to stage dive for that take. The song was again released as a single by Warner/Reprise with "Activity Grrrl" as the B-side.

Popularity
Jett's version has received many rankings, including:
 No. 85 in Q magazine's March 2005 "100 Greatest Guitar Tracks Ever!" list.
 No. 491 in ''Rolling Stones "500 Greatest Songs of All Time" (2010) and No. 484 (2004).
 No. 56 in Billboards "Greatest Songs of All Time".

Personnel
 Joan Jett – lead vocals, rhythm guitar
 Ricky Byrd – lead guitar, backing vocals
 Gary Ryan – bass, backing vocals
 Lee Crystal – drums, backing vocals

Charts

Weekly charts

Year-end charts

All-time charts

Certifications

Britney Spears version

Background, release and composition
"I Love Rock 'n' Roll" is the fourth European single from American pop singer Britney Spears' third studio album, Britney (2001), released on 27 May 2002. The song was used in her 2002 film Crossroads, in which Spears' character Lucy performs it in a karaoke bar. Spears said of the song, "They asked me to sing karaoke in the movie Crossroads and I've actually sung 'I Love Rock 'n' Roll' in a lot of clubs that I've been to." Spears has publicly stated that the original song is one of her favorites. She listened to the original Arrows Mickie Most-produced version just before she recorded the song, according to Jive A&R representative Steve Lunt. The scratches performed on this version were performed by Corey Chase at The Hit Factory Criteria studios in Miami. When promoting the single's release, Spears mistakenly attributed the hit version of the song to Pat Benatar instead of Joan Jett.

Critical reception
Spears' cover was met with mostly favorable reviews. NMEs Ted Kessler wrote that she "still works best when making a good pop cheese and dance sandwich: there's the ace Rodney Jerkins-produced version of Joan Jett's 'I Love Rock 'n' Roll', which does exactly what it says on the tin." Rolling Stones Barry Walters wrote that "producer Rodney Jerkins' hip-hop blaspheming of Joan Jett's "I Love Rock 'n' Roll" doesn't go as far as it should (is a Limp Bizkit remix in its future?), but it certainly beats what her earlier studio architects did to those Sonny and Cher ("The Beat Goes On" on ...Baby One More Time) and Stones ("(I Can't Get No) Satisfaction" on Oops!... I Did It Again) songs." Another positive reception came from PopMatters editor Nikki Tranter, who enjoyed that the song is "different from the average run-of-the-mill pop offering," and praised that "she does strange justice to the tune, vamping up her vocals and turning out something, that while silly and camp, is actually a fun listen." In contrast, David Browne wrote for Entertainment Weekly that "her remake is neither imaginative (it simply xeroxes Joan Jett's arrangement) nor all that believable."

Chart performance
"I Love Rock 'n' Roll" charted moderately upon release, reaching the top 20 in most regions. The song was moderately successful in the UK, where it peaked at number 13 (which, at the time, was Spears' lowest peak for a single released there, until "Radar" only managed to reach number 46 in 2009, and then "I Wanna Go", which peaked at number 111 in 2011). It was certified gold in Australia.

Promotion
Directed by Chris Applebaum, the music video for "I Love Rock 'n' Roll" shows Spears with her own band, a stack of speakers and flashing lights. The video begins in black and white and switches to and from color throughout. It was shot at The Inn, a bar in Long Beach, New York. The video was ranked at number two on the 100 Best Videos of 2002 list during MTV Latin America's countdown. A director's cut version of the video was later leaked, containing previously unseen scenes.

The song was performed live during Spears' Dream Within a Dream Tour (2001–02). In 2016, it was added to the revamped set list of her Las Vegas residency show, Britney: Piece of Me (2016–17), marking the first time Spears performed the song in 14 years. During the performance, Spears rode a mechanical electric guitar, which simulated a mechanical bull, as it rotated on stage. The same prop electric guitar had been used during her Femme Fatale Tour (2011) for a segment in which she covered the song "Burning Up" by Madonna. At the 2016 Billboard Music Awards, the song was performed as part of a medley.

Track listingsEuropean 2-track CD single "I Love Rock 'n' Roll" (Album Version) – 3:06
 "Overprotected" (Darkchild Remix) – 3:18European/Australian CD single "I Love Rock 'n' Roll" (Album Version) – 3:08
 "I Love Rock 'n' Roll" (Karaoke Version) – 3:06
 "Overprotected" (Darkchild Remix) – 3:20
 "I'm Not a Girl, Not Yet a Woman" (Metro Remix) – 5:26German 2 tracks CD single "I Love Rock 'n' Roll" (Album Version) – 3:07
 "I Love Rock 'n' Roll" (Karaoke Version) – 3:05German CD single "I Love Rock 'n' Roll" (Album Version) – 3:07
 "I Love Rock 'n' Roll" (Karaoke Version) – 3:05
 "Overprotected" (Riprock 'N Alex G Remix) – 3:25
 "I'm Not a Girl, Not Yet a Woman" (Metro Remix) – 5:24Japanese CD maxi single "I Love Rock 'n' Roll" (Album Version) – 3:06
 "I Love Rock 'n' Roll" (Karaoke Version) – 3:04
 "Overprotected" (Darkchild Remix) – 3:20
 "I'm Not a Girl, Not Yet a Woman" (Metro Remix) – 5:25
 "I'm a Slave 4 U" (Thunderpuss Radio Mix) – 3:18
 "I'm a Slave 4 U" (Miguel Migs Petalpusher Vocal) – 5:30
 "I'm Not a Girl, Not Yet a Woman" (Spanish Fly Dub Mix) – 5:55UK CD maxi single "I Love Rock 'n' Roll" (Album Version) – 3:06
 "I Love Rock 'n' Roll" (Karaoke Version) – 3:04
 "Overprotected (Darkchild Remix Radio Edit)" – 3:06
 "I Love Rock 'n' Roll" (Video) – 3:06Cassette single "I Love Rock 'n' Roll" (Album Version) – 3:06
 "I Love Rock 'n' Roll" (Karaoke Version) – 3:04
 "Overprotected" (Darkchild Remix Edit) – 3:06Digital download (Digital 45)''' 
 "I Love Rock 'n' Roll" – 3:07
 "I'm Not a Girl, Not Yet a Woman" (Metro Remix Radio Edit) – 3:29

Charts

Weekly charts

Year-end charts

Certifications

Release history

Alex Gaudino and Jason Rooney version

A cover version by Alex Gaudino and Jason Rooney was released in 2008.

Track listing

Credits and personnel
 Lead vocals – Alex Gaudino
 Music – Alan Merrill, Jake Hooker
 Lyrics – Alan Merrill, Jake Hooker
 Scratches – Corey Chase
 Label: 541/NEWS

Chart performance

Release history

LadBaby version

In December 2019, English blogger LadBaby released a comedy version of the song with a sausage roll theme as a charity single whose profits went to The Trussell Trust. The single's cover is based on Abbey Roads cover. The song peaked at number one on the UK Singles Chart and in Scotland.

Background
In December 2019, LadBaby announced his bid for the official Christmas number one. As with their last release "We Built This City", all proceeds from the single went to The Trussell Trust. He said, "We were blown away by the support we received on our Christmas Number 1 single last year and how far that money has gone into changing the lives of families living in poverty across the UK. We're continually looking for ways we can support food bank charity the Trussell Trust further as the size of the problem still facing so many adults (and children) is huge and we ALL need to do whatever we can to say goodbye to poverty once and for all in the UK! If we can use our social media presence for good by singing about sausage rolls, giving people something to smile about and helping families eat this year, then why wouldn’t we. Officially, the most unanticipated single of the decade...AGAIN!"

Charts
On 20 December 2019, the song entered the UK Singles Chart at number one, claiming the Christmas number one with 93,000 chart sales and with 85,000 of that total coming via downloads. It was also the fastest-selling download since Artists for Grenfell version of "Bridge over Troubled Water" in June 2017. LadBaby became the third act to have two consecutive Christmas number one singles and the first to have two successive novelty Christmas number ones in the UK. After reaching number one, LadBaby said, "How have we done this again? It’s the best feeling in the world - it's a Christmas miracle yet again! Thank you everybody for supporting us once again, and all for an amazing cause. It's going to the Trussell Trust – to the 14 million people living in poverty in the UK. Who doesn’t love a sausage roll at Christmas?"

Other notable cover versions
 "Weird Al" Yankovic parodied the song as "I Love Rocky Road".
 Apologetix parodied the song in 2000 as "I Love Apostle Paul".
 Forever Young reached #27 in France in 2003 with their cover version.

See also
List of Billboard Hot 100 number ones of 1982

References

External links
History of the song
Bill Harry's Merseybeat article

1975 songs
1975 singles
1982 singles
2002 singles
2008 singles
Arrows (British band) songs
Jive Records singles
RAK Records singles
Joan Jett songs
Britney Spears songs
Billboard Hot 100 number-one singles
Cashbox number-one singles
Dutch Top 40 number-one singles
RPM Top Singles number-one singles
Number-one singles in South Africa
Number-one singles in Sweden
Music videos directed by Chris Applebaum
Song recordings produced by Mickie Most
Song recordings produced by Rodney Jerkins
Songs about rock music
Number-one singles in Australia
Number-one singles in New Zealand
Black-and-white music videos